One of the most highly profitable aspects of the Royal Canadian Mint’s enterprise is in its Numismatic product line. The euphoria surrounding the year 2000 led to the birth of the Millennium 25-cent coin program. The numismatic line included proof quality coins sold individually or as a complete set. This level of excess would come to signify the coming decade. The number of numismatic releases would increase on an annual basis starting in 2003. Numismatic three cents, five cents, and ten cents would be introduced, along with numismatic three dollars and eight dollars. Luxury coins would not be immune to the dramatic increases that ensued. Coins with face values of 250, 300 and 350 dollars would be introduced by 2006.

A new trend for the RCM would emerge with the design of the numismatic three cent coin. The three cent coin was packaged in a coin and stamp set as part of a joint venture with Canada Post. This partnership would lead to another ten coin and stamp sets in the decade. An additional trend that emerged was the RCM's commitment to military and Olympic coins as well.

From Vimy Ridge to D-Day to a new release of the Victory Nickel with a commemorative booklet, the 5-cent piece became very monumental in acknowledging the contributions of Canada's military in the 20th Century. With the advent of the Lucky Loonie, the good luck charm that brought Olympic gold to Canada's hockey teams in 2002, the RCM paid tribute to that accomplishment with its Going for the Gold set in 2002 featuring a double-dated Loon coin packaged with Maclean's magazine and Olympic stamps. This would be followed by the Sterling Silver Lucky Loonie coins in 2004 and 2006.

The decade would also be marked by very dramatic price increases. Items that could be classified as “staples” in the numismatic offering, such as the Silver Dollar (Proof and Brilliant Uncirculated), the Hundred Dollar Gold, and the Two Hundred Gold, had not experienced significant price increases for several years.

The Silver Dollar from 2000 was priced at $29.95 (Proof) and $19.95 (BU) but in 2006, these two items were now priced at $39.95 and $31.95. At the beginning of the 1990s, the silver dollar was priced at $22.95 for the proof version, and $16.75 for the brilliant version.

More dramatic was the pricing of the One Hundred and Two Hundred Dollar gold. The beginning of the millennium saw the One Hundred Dollar Gold at $259.95 but its price increased to $359.95 by 2006. In 1990, the price of such a coin would have been $245.00. Due to the increase in the value of gold, the two hundred dollar gold experienced an even larger spike in the pricing. Starting in 2000 at $414.95, the price would rise to $564.95. In 1990, the price was only $395.00.

During the decade, there were various technological achievements. The first RCM gold coin to be directly laser etched was the $100 Gold Leduc Oil Fields coin from 2002. The technique would be later used for the 2003 $100 Gold Marquis Wheat coin and the 2004 $20 Iceberg coin. In 2001, the RCM achieved innovation with the 2001 Marconi $5 silver coin. It was the first RCM coin to utilize with a direct lasered finish. One of the technological breakthroughs for the RCM involved the 2006 Canadian Achievement Series silver coin featuring Colonel Chris Hadfield. It was the first Canadian coin to be completely sculpted using computer software.

The Northern Lights $20 Silver Coin was the first RCM hologram coin to feature a hologram without a raised border and, therefore, no delineation. The hologram merges with the engraved relief of the mountains. In 2006, the $30 Canadarm coin was the first Canadian coin to be completely sculpted using computer software. Technically, it was a complex design to render, due to the depiction of the closed glass visor and the complicated features of the Canadarm.

Commemorative Silver Dollar Series

Gold Plated Proof Silver Dollars

These Gold Plated Proof Silver Dollars were packaged with the corresponding Proof Sets for the year.

Montreal Canadiens 100th Anniversary
Four unique gold coins were produced by the RCM to honour the 100th Anniversary of the Montreal Canadiens. The coins are on permanent display at the Centennial Plaza at the Bell Centre in Montreal. The coins have a face value of $1 and have the Canadiens centennial logo on the reverse. The coins are featured on memorial plaques dedicated to four legends: Howie Morenz, Maurice Richard, Jean Beliveau, and Guy Lafleur. The obverse is the Susannah Blunt effigy of Her Majesty Queen Elizabeth II. Each plaque also has two circulation five cent coins marking the start and end of each player's career. The coins were gold plated versions of the nickel aureate dollar used for circulating $1 coins.

A special edition proof silver dollar was also issued with two different types of packaging.

Numismatic One, Three and Five Cents
One Cent

Three Cents

Five Cents

Numismatic Ten Cents

Numismatic 25-cent Pieces

Oversized 25-cent pieces

2005–present

Canada Day

A variant of the 2002 Canada Day coin was issued in circulation without any colour. It was presented to new Canadians at their citizenship ceremony during "Celebrate Canada Day" week. These coins were distributed between July and September 2002 with a final mintage of 30,627,000.

Holiday Coin Set

NHL coins

Birds of Canada series (part 1)

Numismatic Fifty-Cent Collections

Discovering Nature Series
 Started in 1995

Canadian Sports Series
Started in 1998

Canadian Festivals Series

Canadian Folklore and Legends Series

Canadian Floral Collection

Coat of Arms of Canada

1/25 Ounce Gold

Butterfly Collection

60th Anniversary of the end of World War II

Legends of Hockey

All legends sets consisted of four coins with images provided courtesy of the Hockey Hall of Fame.

Numismatic One, Two and Three Dollars

NHL Coins

Specimen Set Variant Dollars

Numismatic Four, Five and Eight Dollars

2003's Coin is double-dated. Its obverse has 2003 on it to signify year of release while its reverse has 2006 to commemorate year of event.

VARIANT was made for British Royal Mint as part of six-coin set from six countries commemorating end of World War II. The reverse was exactly the same as original issue but had privy mark of two maple leaves

The 80th Anniversary of diplomatic relations between Canada and Japan is a joint issue between the Royal Canadian Mint and the Japan Mint. 35,000 coins are made available for Japan Mint customers, while only 5,000 are available for RCM customers.

Ten Dollars

Fifteen Dollars

Chinese Lunar Cameo Coin Series

The last 4 coins are the only coins of their respective year bearing the former effigy of Her Majesty Queen Elizabeth II (1990–2003) designed by Canadian Dora de Pédery-Hunt.

Vignettes of Royalty Series

Customers who subscribed to The Vignettes of Royalty series of coins from the Royal Canadian Mint were, upon completion, given the 2009 King Edward VIII Medallion, an ultra-high relief, pure copper medallion.

Playing Card Money Series

Twenty Dollars

Land, Sea and Rail Transportation Series

Natural Wonders

Lighthouse Collection

National Parks

Tall Ships Collection

Architectural Collection

International Polar Year
The Royal Canadian Mint's $20 silver coin, launched on July 18, 2007, has evoked one of the darkest moments in the history of polar exploration and rankled Canada's main Inuit organization.
The coin was struck to mark the 125th anniversary of the International Polar Year scientific studies and features a "world first" metallic-blue finish meant to mimic the Arctic's icy hues.
On one side of the coin is the customary portrait of Queen Elizabeth; on the other, 16th-century British explorer Martin Frobisher and a compass rose from his era, along with images of the ship he sailed in search of the fabled Northwest Passage and an Inuit man paddling his kayak in ice-choked waters.

A mint spokesman said the kayaker is simply meant to represent the indigenous people of the North and their role in Arctic exploration.
However, the combination of elements recalls an infamous episode from Frobisher's 1576 voyage to Baffin Island and the tragic fate of an unnamed Inuit paddler who was lured aboard the explorer's ship, Gabriel, and kidnapped for transport back to England as proof of the expedition's success in reaching the New World.
The Inuit captive, one of the first native North Americans known to have reached Europe, was put on circus-style display in England and became the subject of portraits, including one intended for Frobisher's sponsor, Queen Elizabeth I, before dying—probably of pneumonia or exposure to European disease—only weeks after arriving.

Great Canadian Locomotives

Crystal Raindrop

NHL Goalie Mask Coins

Canadian Commerce

Crystal Snowflake

The crystalline beauty of a snowflake shimmers with genuine CRYSTALLIZED Swarovski Elements

Holiday Pine Cones

A pair of pine cones with genuine CRYSTALLIZED Swarovski Elements to enhance the pine needles and a decorative ribbon along the coin's edge

Other Holiday Coins

2011 is a traditional star-topped Christmas tree wrapped in fluffy garlands and studded with five genuine CRYSTALLIZED Swarovski Element "lights".

Other Coins

Thirty Dollars

Canadian Achievements

National War Memorials

Fifty Dollars

Seventy-Five Dollars

100 Dollar Gold

2002 was the first $100 Gold Coin to feature colouring on it. A sea of “black gold” was featured to commemorate the discovery of the Leduc Oil Field on February 13, 1947.

150 Dollar Gold

18K Gold Proof Lunar Hologram Coin Series

18K Gold Proof Lunar Coin Series

Scallop-shaped Series

200 Dollar Gold

Celebrating Canadian Native Cultures and Traditions

Canadian Art and Artists

Canadian Commerce

250 Dollar Gold

300 Dollars

In 2002 the three cameos are 99.99% silver.

In 2004 each cameo is struck in 24KT gold.

2006 was the Royal Canadian Mint's first coin incorporating authentic Swarovski Crystals in the design.

Canadian Achievements

In 2005, in order to represent each of Canada's time zones, the RCM issued six variants of the coin. The variants represented a total mintage of 1,200 coins.

Shinplaster

Provincial Coat of Arms

Premium Gold Coin Series

Platinum Prehistoric Animals Collection

350 Dollar Gold

Provincial Flowers

1998 features the "4 Flowers" of the Canadian Coat of Arms symbolically represent each of the four founding nations of Canada - the French, the English, the Scottish and the Irish.

500 Dollars

2007 was Royal Canadian Mint’s first five ounce gold coin and the introduction of the new 500 Dollar denomination

Palladium coins

Big and Little Bear Constellations

Platinum coins

Endangered Wildlife Series
This collection started in 1995.

Collector Cards

The first Collector Card that was issued was to commemorate the creation of a new effigy for her majesty Queen Elizabeth II in 2003 and a redemption was offered in Chatelaine magazine. In 2004, to commemorate the Acadie 25-cent coin. One card was included with every phone order after the launch of the commemorative coin. With the release of the Lucky Loonie, a third Collector Card was created. To procure a card, customers had to go on the RCM website and place a request online. A total of 23 Collector Coin Cards have been released to date, mostly selling online for substantially more than they were when originally released.

2003
 Queen's Effigy

2004
 400th Anniversary of Acadia (Quarter)
 Lucky Loonie
 Poppy (Quarter)

2005
 Alberta Centennial Quarter
 Saskatchewan Centennial Quarter
 Terry Fox Loonie 
 Victory Nickel
 Year of the Veteran Quarter

2006
 10th Anniversary Toonie
 Lucky Loonie
 Medal of Bravery (Quarter)
 Pink Ribbon Breast Cancer Quarter

2007
 Vancouver Olympics (15 Quarters, 2 Loonies)

2008
400th Anniversary of Québec (Toonie)

2010
Poppy (2004, 2008, 2010 Quarters)

2011
Legendary Nature (Toonie, Loonie, 3 Colored and 3 Non-Colored Quarters)

2012
War of 1812 (Toonie, 8 Colored and 8 Non-Colored Quarters)

2013
Arctic Expedition (4 Quarters (2 Frosted, 2 Un-Frosted)

2014
"Wait For Me, Daddy" (Toonie)

2015
Sir John A. MacDonald (Toonie)
50th Anniversary of the Canadian Flag (1 Colored, Non-Colored)

Definition of finishes
 Bullion
 Brilliant relief against a parallel lined background.
 Proof
 Frosted relief against a mirror background
 Specimen
 Brilliant relief on a satin background.

Mint marks

A
Used on 2005 Palladium Test Coin to signify the coins were struck from Lot A.
B
Used on 2005 Palladium Test Coin to signify the coins were struck from Lot B.
C
Placed on sovereigns produced at the Ottawa branch of the Royal Mint, between 1908 and 1919.
Dot
In December 1936, King Edward VIII abdicated the throne in favour of his brother, who would become King George VI. The problem was that the Royal Mint was designing the effigy of King Edward VIII and now a new effigy would need to be created. The 1, 10 and 25 cent pieces in 1937 would be struck from dies with a 1936 date on the reverse. To distinguish that these coins were issued in 1937, a Dot Mint Mark was placed on the 1936 dies, and could be found beneath the year. These coins fulfilled demand for coins until new coinage tools with the effigy of King George VI were ready. While the 10 and 25 cent coins are more common, the 1 cent coins are rare, with about a half-dozen known to exist.
06SFS
Used to describe the rare 2006 $50 Four Seasons 5 ounce silver coin.  Only 2000 were minted.
H
Used to identify coins that were struck for Canada by the Birmingham Mint, also known as the Heaton Mint, until 1907.
Innukshuk
All circulation coins for the 2010 Vancouver Olympics have the Innukshuk Mint Mark on the obverse of the coin.
International Polar Year
The obverse of the 2007 International Polar Year $20 Numismatic Coin has the logo for the International Polar Year on the obverse of the coin.
Man Becomes Mountain
(Symbol of Paralympics)
All circulation coins for the 2010 Vancouver Paralympics have the Paralympic Games logo on the obverse of the coin.
Maple Leaf
All coins with a Maple Leaf Mint Mark were struck in 1948 due to an emergency with coin toolage. The granting of India’s independence resulted in the removal of IND:IMP (meaning Emperor of India) from King George VI’s effigy. Due to the demand for circulation coins in 1948, coins for 1948 could not be struck until the new tools were received. The new tools would have the IND:IMP removed from them. In the meanwhile, coins were produced in 1948 with a year of 1947 on them. A small Maple Leaf Mint Mark was struck beside 1947 on the reverse of all coins to signify the year of production.
P
From 2001 to 2006, most one cent, five cents, ten cents, twenty-five cents, and fifty cents issued for circulation were struck with a P Mint Mark to represent the Royal Canadian Mint’s plating process.
RCM Logo
At the CNA Convention in July 2006, the RCM unveiled its new Mint Mark to be used on all circulation and numismatic coinage. The agenda behind the implementation of this new Mint Mark was to help increase the RCM’s image as a brand. The aim of the logo is to educate coin users and coin collectors, respectively, that the RCM is minting Canada’s coins. The first Circulation Coin to have this new Mint Mark is the 10th Anniversary Two-Dollar coin. The first Numismatic Coin to have this new Mint Mark is the Snowbirds Coin and Stamp Set.
T/É
In an effort to push the standard of quality higher, the RCM started to experiment with a gold bullion coin that would have a purity of 99.999%. The result was a Gold Maple Leaf Test Bullion coin with the Mint Mark of T/É (to signify Test/Épreuve). The date on the obverse of the coin was 2007 and it had a mintage of 500.
Teddy bear
When the RCM released its Baby Lullabies and CD Set, a sterling silver one dollar coin was included in the set. The one dollar coin included a mint mark of a teddy bear.
W
Used occasionally on specimen sets produced in Winnipeg, starting in 1998.
W/P
Used on the Special Edition Uncirculated Set of 2003. The W mint mark stated that the coin was produced in Winnipeg and the P states that the coins are plated.

See also 
Royal Canadian Mint numismatic coins (20th century)
Royal Canadian Mint numismatic coins (2010s)
Canadian Silver Maple Leaf
Royal Canadian Mint Olympic Coins

References

 Charlton Standard Catalogue of Canadian Coins, 60th Edition, 2006, W.K. Cross

External links
 Royal Canadian Mint's Official Website
 Royal Canadian Mint Act
 Numismatic Network Canada
 Canadian Coin News

Numismatic, 2000s